The 2013 OFC U-17 Championship was the 15th edition of the OFC's Under 17 championship, the biennial football championship of the Oceanian Confederation.  All matches took place at Chapuis stadium, Luganville in Vanuatu from 17 to 27 April. 6 teams contested the final round of the Championship after the Solomon Islands Football Federation withdrew, as it could only financially support its Beach Soccer and Fustal sides in national competition.

As winners, New Zealand qualified as Oceania's representative for the 2013 FIFA U-17 World Cup.

Qualification

5 teams 'pre-qualified' for the competition (before the Solomon Islands withdrawal), with the final team being decided through a preliminary round hosted by Samoa in late January 2013.

 (Host nation)
 (preliminary round winner)

Preliminary round
A preliminary competition was required to find the Sixth and final place in the competition. The mini-tournament was hosted by the Samoan Football Federation between the dates of 22 and 26 January 2013.

All Times are local Time (UTC+14:00)

Goalscorers
4 goals

 Sinisa Tua
 Hemaloto Polovili

3 goals

 Paulo Scanlan

2 goals

 Kaleopa Siligi
 Filisi Keni
 Maro Bonsu-Maro

1 goal

 Pekay Edwards
 Sunai Joseph
 Wiremu Temata
 Morgan Wichman
 Takuina Tararo
 Dwayne Tiputoa
 Sue Pelesa
 Paia Ipiniu
 Uasi Talanoa
 Taniela Vaka'uta

Final round
The draw for the final round of competition was held at the Headquarters of the Oceania Football Confederation on 13 February 2013. The teams will play each other once in a round robin tournament based on a league system, with the winner qualifying for the FIFA U-17 World Cup

All times are local time (UTC+11:00)

Matchday 1

Matchday 2

Matchday 3

Matchday 4

Matchday 5

References

External links
Preliminary Round at OFC Site
Final Round at OFC Site
Tournament Summary

2013
Under 17
OFC Under 17 Tournament
2013
2013 in youth association football